Erigeron nivalis is a North American species of flowering plant in the family Asteraceae, called the northern daisy. It is widespread across much of western North America from Alaska east to Northwest Territories and south as far as California and New Mexico.

Erigeron nivalis is a biennial or perennial herb up to 35 centimeters (14 inches) tall. The plant generally produces 1-8 flower heads per stem, each head with up to 70 white or pink ray florets surrounding numerous yellow disc florets. The species grows in rocky sites and meadows in open woods and subalpine areas.

References

Flora of North America
nivalis
Plants described in 1841